The 2016–17 Fordham Rams women's basketball team represented Fordham University during the 2016–17 NCAA Division I women's basketball season. The Rams were led by sixth-year head coach Stephanie Gaitley. They were members of the Atlantic 10 Conference and played their home games at the Rose Hill Gymnasium. They finished the season 22–12, 11–5 in A-10 play to finish in fifth place. They advanced to the quarterfinals of the A-10 women's tournament where they lost to Saint Louis. They were invited to the Women's National Invitation Tournament where they defeated Georgetown in the first round before losing to Penn State in the second round.

2016–17 media

Forham Rams Sports Network
Forham Rams games will be broadcast on WFUV Sports and streamed online through the Fordham Portal. Most home games will also be featured on the A-10 Digital Network. Select games will be televised.

Roster

Schedule

|-
!colspan=9 style="background:#76032E; color:#FFFFFF;"| Exhibition

|-
!colspan=9 style="background:#76032E; color:#FFFFFF;"| Regular season

|-
!colspan=9 style="background:#880038; color:#FFFFFF;"| Atlantic 10 Women's Tournament

|-
!colspan=9 style="background:#880038; color:#FFFFFF;"| WNIT

Rankings

See also
 2016–17 Fordham Rams men's basketball team

References

Fordham
Fordham Rams women's basketball seasons
Fordham
Fordham
2017 Women's National Invitation Tournament participants